Hedong Subdistrict is a subdistrict in the heart of the city of Genhe, Inner Mongolia, People's Republic of China. The subdistrict derives its name from its location east of the Gen River which flows through Genhe. , it has three residential communities under its administration.

See also
List of township-level divisions of Inner Mongolia

References

Township-level divisions of Inner Mongolia
Genhe